Kerala Blasters Football Club is an Indian professional association football club based in Kochi, Kerala, who play in the Indian Super League. Established on 27 May 2014, they were the founding members of Indian Super League in 2014.

This list encompasses the major honours won by Kerala Blasters, records set by the club, their managers and their players. The player records section includes details of the club's leading goalscorers and those who have made most appearances in first-team competitions.

All statistics are correct as of 3 March 2023.

Honours

Indian Super League
Runners-up (3): 2014, 2016, 2021–22

Competitive record
The table that follows is accurate as of the 2022–23 season for all competitions.

Club records

Matches

Firsts

 First match: Kerala Blasters 0–1 NorthEast United, Indian Super League, 13 October 2014
 First win: Kerala Blasters 2–1 Pune City, Indian Super League, 30 October 2014
 First Super Cup match: Kerala Blasters 2–3 NEROCA, 6 April 2018
 First Durand Cup match: Kerala Blasters 1–0 Indian Navy, 11 September 2021

Wins
 Record win: 5–1 against Hyderabad in the Indian Super League, 5 January 2020
 Record away league win:
 1–4 against NorthEast United, 15 November 2015
 0–3 against Mumbai City, 19 December 2021
 0–3 against Chennaiyin, 22 December 2021
 0–3 against NorthEast United, 5 November 2022
 Record Durand Cup win: 0–3 against NorthEast United, 27 August 2022
 Most league wins in a season: 10 wins from 21 games (during the 2022–23 season)
 Fewest league wins in a season: 2 wins from 18 games (during the 2018–19 season)
 Most home league wins in a season: 7 wins from 9 games (during the 2022–23 season)
 Most league wins away from home in a season: 3 wins from 9 games (during the 2022–23 season)

Defeats
 Record defeat: 
 1–5 against Mumbai City in the Indian Super League, 19 November 2016
 1–6 against Mumbai City in the Indian Super League, 16 December 2018
 Record defeat at home:
 3–6 against Chennaiyin in the Indian Super League, 1 February 2020 (also record-scoring defeat)
 2–5 against ATK Mohun Bagan in the Indian Super League, 16 October 2022
 Record Super Cup defeat: 0–2 against Indian Arrows, 15 March 2019
 Record Durand Cup defeat: 0–3 against Mohammedan, 9 September 2022
 Most league defeats in a season: 9 defeats from 20 games (during the 2020–21 season) 
 Fewest league defeats in a season:
 4 defeats from 14 games (during the 2014 season) 
 4 defeats from 20 games (during the 2021–22 season)

Draws
 Highest scoring draw: 
 4–4 against Odisha in the Indian Super League, 23 February 2020 (also a league record)
 4–4 against Goa in the Indian Super League, 6 March 2022 (also a league record)
 Most league draws in a season: 9 draws from 18 games (during the 2018–19 season)

Record consecutive results
 Record consecutive wins: 5 (from 5 November to 19 December 2022)
 Record consecutive defeats: 4 (from 13 to 27 October 2015)
 Record consecutive matches without a defeat: 8 (from 5 November 2022 to 3 January 2023)
 Record consecutive matches without a win: 14 (from 5 October 2018 to 6 February 2019)
 Record consecutive home league wins; record consecutive home league matches without defeat: 6 (from 13 November 2022 to 7 February 2023)
 Record consecutive draws: 4 (from 5 October to 2 November 2018)
 Record consecutive matches without conceding a goal: 4 (from 6 to 16 November 2014)
 Record consecutive matches in which Kerala Blasters have scored a goal: 14 (from 3 December 2017 to 17 February 2018)
 Record consecutive home league defeats:
 2 (from 5 to 11 November 2018)
 2 (from 16 to 28 October 2022)
 Record consecutive home league matches without a win: 7 (from 5 October 2018 to 25 January 2019)

Goals
 More league goals scored in a season: 34 goals in 20 games (during the 2021–22 season)
 Fewest league goals scored in a season: 9 goals in 14 games (during the 2014 season) 
 Most league goals conceded in a season: 36 goals in 20 games (during the 2020–21 season)
 Fewest league goals conceded in a season: 11 goals in 14 games (during the 2014 season)

Points
 Most points in a season: 34 points from 20 games (during the 2021–22 season)
 Fewest points in a season: 13 points from 14 games (during the 2015 season)

Attendance
Record highest home attendance: 62,087 (against Delhi Dynamos in the Indian Super League, 18 October 2015)
 Highest average home attendance in a season: 52,008 (during the 2016 season, also a league record)
 Record lowest home attendance: 3,298 (against Chennaiyin in the Indian Super League, 15 February 2019)
 Lowest average home attendance in a season: 17,125 (during the 2018–19 season)

Player records

Appearances
Most appearance in all competitions: 94, Sahal Abdul Samad
Most league appearances: 92, Sahal Abdul Samad
Most Super Cup appearances: 2
Prasanth Karuthadathkuni
Nemanja Lakić-Pešić
Most Durand Cup appearances: 5, 12 players
Youngest first-team player: Dheeraj Singh Moirangthem, 18 years and 85 days (against ATK, 29 September 2018)
Oldest first-team player: David James, 44 years and 139 days (against Atlético de Kolkata, 20 December 2014)

Most appearances
Bold denotes players currently playing for the club.

Goalscorers
Most goals in all competitions: 15, Bartholomew Ogbeche
Most league goals: 15, Bartholomew Ogbeche
Most goals in Super Cup: 1 
Pulga
Prasanth Karuthadathkuni
First player to score for Kerala Blasters: Iain Hume (against Chennaiyin, 21 October 2014)
First Indian player to score for Kerala Blasters: C. S. Sabeeth (against Pune City, 30 October 2014)
First goal in home ground: Milagres Gonsalves (against Goa, 6 November 2014)
First goalscorer in Super Cup: Pulga (against NEROCA, 5 April 2018)
First Indian goalscorer in Super Cup: Prasanth Karuthadathkuni (against NEROCA, 5 April 2018)
First goalscorer in Durand Cup: Adrián Luna (against Indian Navy FC, 11 September 2021)
Most goals in Durand Cup: 3, Mohammed Aimen
Most goals in a season: 15, Bartholomew Ogbeche (2019–20)
Most goals in a match: 3
Iain Hume (against Delhi Dynamos, 10 January 2018)
Bartholomew Ogbeche (against Chennaiyin, 1 February 2020)
First hat-trick: Iain Hume (against Delhi Dynamos, 10 January 2018)
Youngest goalscorer in league: Deependra Negi, 19 years and 68 days
Youngest foreign goalscorer: Mark Sifneos, 21 years and 9 days
Oldest goalscorer: Wes Brown, 38 years and 127 days
Fastest goal scored in a match: 29 seconds, Chris Dagnall (against NorthEast United, 15 November 2015)

Top goalscorers
Competitive matches only. Matches played (including as a substitute) appear in brackets.

Bold denotes players currently playing for the club. Matches played appear in brackets.

Assists
Most assists in all competitions: 13, Adrián Luna
First assist: Milagres Gonsalves (against ATK, 26 October 2014)
Most assists in a season: 7, Adrián Luna (2021–22)

Most assists
Competitive matches only. Matches played (including as a substitute) appear in brackets.

Bold denotes players currently playing for the club.

Clean sheets
Most clean sheets in all competitions: 11, Prabhsukhan Singh Gill
First clean sheet: David James (against Goa, 6 November 2014)
Most clean sheets in a season: 7, Prabhsukhan Singh Gill (2021–22)

Most clean sheets
Competitive matches only. Matches played (including as a substitute) appear in brackets.

Bold denotes players currently playing for the club.

Miscellaneous records 
 Most penalty saves in an Indian Super League season: 3, Albino Gomes (2020–21)
 First Indian goalkeeper to assist in the Indian Super League: Albino Gomes (for Jordan Murray against East Bengal, 15 January 2021)
 Longest goal in the Indian Super League: 59 meters, Álvaro Vázquez (against NorthEast United, 4 February 2022)

Players' individual honours while playing with Kerala Blasters

Indian Super League
 Indian Super League Hero of the League:
  Iain Hume (2014)
 Indian Super League Golden Glove:
  Prabhsukhan Singh Gill (2021–22)
 Indian Super League Emerging Player of the League (3):
  Sandesh Jhingan (2014)
  Lalruatthara (2017–18)
  Sahal Abdul Samad (2018–19)

Managerial records

 First manager: David James, from 13 August to 20 December 2014 
 Longest-serving manager: Ivan Vukomanović,  (from 17 June 2021 to present) 
Shortest tenure as manager by time (excluding caretakers): Terry Phelan,  (from 1 November to 20 December 2015)
 Shortest tenure as a manager by matches (excluding caretakers): Peter Taylor, 6 matches (from 12 May to 28 October 2015)
 Most matches won as manager: 21, Ivan Vukomanović
 Most matches lost as manager: 17
 Ivan Vukomanović
 Highest win percentage: 44.68%, Ivan Vukomanović
 Lowest win percentage (excluding caretakers): 14.29%, René Meulensteen

See also
 Kerala Blasters FC
 List of Kerala Blasters FC players
 List of Indian Super League records and statistics
 Kerala Blasters FC results by opponent
 List of Kerala Blasters FC seasons
 List of Kerala Blasters FC managers

Notes

References

Records and statistics
Kerala Blasters FC